Choczewo (formerly , (1938–45): Gotendorf) is a village in Wejherowo County, Pomeranian Voivodeship, in northern Poland. It is the seat of the gmina (administrative district) called Gmina Choczewo.

Choczewo lies on the disused Wejherowo to Garczegorze railway line (PKP rail line 230), and had a station on it on the north side of the village.

It is home to the Choczewo Municipal Education Team, which is housed in the 18th-century manor house of the von Dzieciskich family in the southern part of the village.

For details of the history of the region, see History of Pomerania.

The village has a population of 1,310.

In 2011, Choczewo was selected, along with two other sites (Gąski and Żarnowiec), to host the first Polish nuclear power plant, scheduled to be built 9 years later. In 2014, a government study postponed the opening of this first Polish plant to 2024. Then, in early 2015, the Minister of Finance postponed commissioning to 2027.

On December 22, 2021, Polskie Elektrownie Jądrowe announced the preferred location for Poland's first commercial nuclear power plant at a site called Lubiatowo-Kopalino near the village to the northwest.

References

Images of Choczewo

Choczewo